Aïn Djeloula is a small town and commune in the Kairouan Governorate of central Tunisia, situated 30 kilometers west of Kairouan and the eastern mountains of Jebel Ousselat. In 2004 it had a population of 1,651.

The surroundings contain numerous caves housing prehistoric remains.

References

Populated places in Kairouan Governorate
Communes of Tunisia